Cucharas River is a  tributary of the Huerfano River that flows from a source in Huerfano County, Colorado, southwest of the Spanish Peaks in San Isabel National Forest.  The river passes through La Veta and Walsenburg before joining the Huerfano River in Pueblo County.

Cucharas Canyon

Northeast of Walsenburg, the river creates a deep, wild canyon called Cucharas Canyon. Much of the land in and adjacent to the canyon was purchased by the Bureau of Land Management in 1998 and is open to the public for recreational activities such as hiking, horseback riding, and hunting. Access to the canyon is via county roads, with trailheads on either side. There are few visitors, and opportunities for solitude are abundant.

See also

 List of rivers of Colorado

References

External links

Rivers of Colorado
Tributaries of the Arkansas River
Rivers of Huerfano County, Colorado
Rivers of Pueblo County, Colorado
Canyons and gorges of Colorado